Arthur Chapman (2 June 1861 – 13 April 1950) was a New Zealand cricketer. He played in six first-class matches for Canterbury from 1881 to 1892.

See also
 List of Canterbury representative cricketers

References

External links
 

1861 births
1950 deaths
New Zealand cricketers
Canterbury cricketers
Cricketers from Christchurch